Robert Brooks (November 1, 1945 – October 11, 1994) was an American professional baseball player who appeared in 55 games in Major League Baseball over parts of four seasons for the Oakland Athletics (– and ) and California Angels.

Brooks entered pro baseball in 1965 when he was chosen by the Athletics (then in Kansas City) out of Los Angeles Harbor College in the 15th round of the first-ever MLB June amateur draft. He earned his first big-league call-up in September 1969 after an All-Star season in the Double-A Southern League, when he led the circuit in runs scored (102) and home runs (23), and tied for the league RBI title (100). Brooks appeared in 29 late-season games for Oakland in 1969, starting 21 as a corner outfielder, smashed three homers and drove in ten runs, batting .241.  But that would be his most extensive big-league trial: over the next four years, he appeared in only 26 total MLB games, and spent all of 1971 and the bulk of the other three seasons in Triple-A. He finished his professional career in 1975 after two years in the Mexican League.

Brooks collected 33 hits in his 55 major-league games, 11 of them for extra bases—six doubles and five homers—along with 20 runs batted in. He batted .231 lifetime.

In retirement, Brooks became an active youth baseball coach in his community, Harbor City, California; a baseball diamond there is named Bobby Brooks Field. He died of complications from multiple sclerosis on October 11, 1994, at the age of 48.

References

External links
, or Retrosheet

1945 births
1994 deaths
African-American baseball players
American expatriate baseball players in Mexico
Baseball players from Los Angeles
Birmingham A's players
Burlington Bees players
California Angels players
Cañeros de Los Mochis players
Neurological disease deaths in California
Deaths from multiple sclerosis
Dorados de Chihuahua players
Iowa Oaks players
Los Angeles Harbor Seahawks baseball players
Major League Baseball outfielders
Modesto Reds players
Oakland Athletics players
Peninsula Grays players
Rieleros de Aguascalientes players
St. Cloud Rox players
Salt Lake City Angels players
Tiburones de La Guaira players
American expatriate baseball players in Venezuela
Toledo Mud Hens players
20th-century African-American sportspeople